The Furgglenfirst is a multi-summited mountain of the Appenzell Alps located on the border between the Swiss cantons of Appenzell Innerrhoden and St. Gallen.

The main summit, named Hintere Hüser, has a height of 1,951 metres above sea level.

References

External links
Furgglenfirst on Hikr

Mountains of the Alps
Mountains of Switzerland
Mountains of Appenzell Innerrhoden
Mountains of the canton of St. Gallen
Appenzell Alps
One-thousanders of Switzerland
Appenzell Innerrhoden–St. Gallen border